The 2019 FineMark Women's Pro Tennis Championship was a professional tennis tournament played on outdoor clay courts. It was the first edition of the tournament which was part of the 2019 ITF Women's World Tennis Tour. It took place in Bonita Springs, Florida, United States between 6 and 12 May 2019.

Singles main-draw entrants

Seeds

 1 Rankings are as of 29 April 2019.

Other entrants
The following players received wildcards into the singles main draw:
  Usue Maitane Arconada
  Sara Kelly
  Ann Li
  Shelby Rogers

The following players received entry from the qualifying draw:
  Louisa Chirico
  Leylah Annie Fernandez
  Olga Govortsova
  Maegan Manasse
  Gabriela Talabă
  Renata Zarazúa

Champions

Singles

 Lauren Davis def.  Ann Li, 7–5, 7–5

Doubles

 Alexa Guarachi /  Erin Routliffe def.  Usue Maitane Arconada /  Caroline Dolehide, 6–3, 7–6(7–5)

References

External links
 2019 FineMark Women's Pro Tennis Championship at ITFtennis.com
 Official website

2019 ITF Women's World Tennis Tour
2019 in American sports